John W. Urquhart (born November 10, 1947) was the 33rd sheriff of King County, Washington and a Democrat. He served as the county's chief law enforcement official and oversaw the more than 1000 employees of the King County Sheriff's Office.

Early life
Urquhart grew up in Seattle, Washington. He attended Ingraham High School, graduating in 1967 as class president. He then attended the University of Washington, graduating with a Bachelor's degree in business in 1971. He owned an electrical construction materials business in Bellevue, which he sold in 1988.

Career 
Urquhart's first job in law enforcement was as a Reserve Deputy Sheriff for the Island County Sheriff's Department, serving from 1975 to 1980. He then joined the King County Sheriff's Office as a Reserve Deputy Sheriff in 1980, eventually becoming in a full-time Deputy Sheriff in 1988. He was voted officer of the year for the Burien precinct in 1991. He was overall officer of the year in 1992.

During his 24-year career with the department, he served in a number of roles including: field training officer, narcotics detective, sergeant, administrative aide to the sheriff, and spokesman. He retired in February 2012 and became president of the S.H.E.R.I.F.F. Fund, a non-profit organization.

In late 2012, Urquhart decided to enter the race for King County Sheriff, a non-partisan elected office. He was elected as King County Sheriff in November 2012, defeating Republican Steve Strachan with 56 percent of the vote. He immediately hired Anne Kirkpatrick, chief of the Spokane Police Department, as his second in command.

In 2016, a lawsuit was filed against Urquhart, alleging that he had raped a former sheriff's deputy in 2002. Another former deputy accused Urquhart of groping him; the deputy received $160,000 in an unusual settlement that was not approved by the King County Executive's office. Some old class mates of his also stepped forward to share stories of harassment they experienced at the hands of Urquhart.

Urquhart ran for reelection as King County Sheriff in 2017 and was defeated by challenger Mitzi Johanknecht, a major from the Southwest Precinct.

Personal life 
Uruqhart's wife is Shelley. They have two children.

References

External links
http://johnforsheriff.com/johns-biography/ Campaign Website

Washington (state) sheriffs
Living people
University of Washington Foster School of Business alumni
Politicians from Seattle
1947 births
People from Mercer Island, Washington